West View Park was an American amusement park, located in West View, Pennsylvania, north of Pittsburgh. It was owned by T.M. Harton Company of Pittsburgh through its subsidiary company West View Park Company, which was founded in December 1905. The park opened on May 23, 1906. The dance hall that was constructed in the park, Danceland, became a landmark for various bands and artists that performed there. Notably, the park featured The Rolling Stones at Danceland in 1964. The park operated for 71 seasons, closing in 1977 due to declining revenues, higher operating costs, and a lack of investment. The park was in an abandoned state for several years and subjected to several fires started by arsonists before being torn down in 1980 and replaced by a shopping center and residential facility in 1981.

History

Pre-amusement park era 
The T.M. Harton Company led by founder, Theodore M. Harton II, opened West View Park in 1906.

1906–1918: T.M. Harton era 
West View Park opened one week before Memorial Day, Wednesday, May 23, 1906. The park was constructed at a cost of approximately $250,000. The park initially had a combination water ride called Mystic Chute, a roller coaster called Figure Eight, a carousel (with horses likely carved by D.C. Muller Brothers), and a Pony Track in which people could ride ponies. The Pony Track also featured miniature automobiles (a modern example would be the Arrow Development car ride) which people could ride.

Between then and 1918, West View Park would add several roller coasters. In 1909, the park replaced the original Figure Eight with a new Figure Eight. In 1910, the Dips, which was built along the lake in the park, opened. The Dips operated under several different names, such as Leap-the-Dips, but the roller coaster remained in the park through the closure of the park in 1977. The park replaced the Mystic Chute and second Figure Eight in 1917 with a new figure eight roller coaster called Speed-o-Plane. The Speed-o-Plane remained in the park through 1927, when it was completely rebuilt and renamed Greyhound.

In 1914, the park replaced the original 1906 carousel with a new carousel. The park also featured several other funhouses and dark rides aside from Katzenjammer Castle, such as the Frazzle House, House of Enchantment, and Hilarity Hall.

1919–1930: Post-Harton boom era 
On March 1, 1919, company founder T.M. Harton died at age 56, after getting sick with pneumonia several weeks earlier.

The first ride not manufactured by the T.M. Harton Company for West view Park was installed in 1919 - a W.F. Mangels Company ride, The Whip. A number of other amusement rides were added, including a Scooter, a Caterpillar, and a second carousel, which was unusual for a park to feature two full sized carousels, as well as a ride called Joy Plane.

In 1927, a new major roller coaster was added. It was a racing mobius roller coaster called Racing Whippet. The ride was unusual in that you entered the queue line from underneath the station, and then walked up a ramp into the station, where you could choose which side you wanted to ride on. A ride similar to this today is Lightning Racer at Hersheypark in Hershey, PA.

The end of the era saw the addition of a Tumble Bug in 1929 and a Cuddle Up in 1930.

1931–1945: Depression and World War II era 
The Great Depression was a significant setback for T.M. Harton Company. Many of its investments in other places were faltering, resulting in them losing businesses. Furthermore, destabilization throughout the 1930s in Europe led the Harton Company to pull out of Europe. This, combined with the effects of the Depression on the Pittsburgh region, resulted in little changes being made in West View Park for the first half of the 1930s. After the Cuddle Up was installed, the next new amusement ride was not installed until 1935.

However, the park did make some changes in this time period, such as replacing the Pony Track with the Talkie Temple in 1932. The Talkie Temple was a success during these lean years because they featured talkie movies at this little amphitheater. After talkies became ubiquitous, the Talkie Temple became a place where shows were put on for children.

Beginning with the addition of the Water Skooter ride on the park lake in 1935, the park would see a new ride added to the park most years throughout the end of the Great Depression and World War II. West View Park's first Eyerly Aircraft Company ride was installed in 1936, the Loop-O-Plane, and a similar ride, Stratoship, manufactured by R.E. Chambers Company, was installed in 1939.

World War II was a tough time for amusement parks, on several different fronts. Employment was difficult because many men left to go to fight in the war. Then, in 1943, the United States government imposed a pleasure driving ban in many places in the United States, including all of Pennsylvania. This ban was put in place due to oil shortages during World War II. This meant that a person could drive a motorized vehicle only to and from important places, such as work. You were not allowed to drive to places for entertainment. During this time period, many amusement parks struggled to get through 1942 and 1943, especially once the pleasure driving ban was in place. However, West View Park succeeded because of its location and proximity to so many homes.

In fact, during the war years 1942-1945, West View Park added several kiddie rides as well as a Chair-O-Plane ride.

1946–1965: The George M. Harton III era 
In 1945, George M. Harton III returned home from World War II. Harton effectively then became general manager of West View Park, a position he would maintain until his death in 1966. This era was the peak of West View Park, with many new and modern rides being installed in the park during his tenure.

Despite West View Park's success in the 1950s, things were beginning to change in the amusement park industry. In 1955, Walt Disney had introduced Disneyland to the world. Many investors were interested in replicating Disney's park. This led to the rise of the modern theme park, such as Six Flags Over Texas, which opened in 1961. Other parks were renovating to match these theme parks, such as Cedar Point beginning around 1960, Geauga Lake in 1969, and Hersheypark, beginning in 1971.

In addition to the rise of the theme park, another impact was the decline of streetcar services. This had been a major pull for visitors to West View Park over the parks first six decades, but by 1965, ridership had so sharply declined that streetcar services were discontinued to the park. Another aspect that was on the decline were the use of dance halls. Where dancehalls had been the place to go in the 1920s, 1930s, 1940s, and part of the 1950s, interest began to wane in the late 50s. Throughout the 1960s, popular music acts were largely shifting from dance halls to stadiums and arenas. However, park management did what they could to keep interest in Danceland - they even got The Rolling Stones to play at the park's dance hall on June 17, 1964, in front of 400 people.

1966–1977: Post-Harton decline 
The park did not stop adding rides, but they were only smaller additions and nothing major. The park operated a Chance Rides Sky Wheel in 1969 and 1970, and added a miniature railroad in 1970, as well as a new Paratrooper and Tempest ride in the early 70s. No amusement rides were added to the park in the mid-1970s, except that dark ride Davey Jones Locker was renovated into a dark ride called Land of the Giants in 1977. Unfortunately for West View Park, these additions paled in comparison to what competitor parks were adding. For example, Hersheypark added more than a dozen rides between 1972 and 1977. Across Pittsburgh, Kennywood added its first million dollar ride with the Log Jammer. Without increased investment or the space for such spectacular rides, West View Park could not compete with increased competition.

On the early morning of September 29, 1973, Danceland burned to the ground. This was the result of faulty electrical wiring. Danceland had been valued at $1 million ($ in 2018 US Dollars), and it was not rebuilt. While Danceland wasn't remotely as popular a music venue as it had once been, it was a landmark for the region. Losing Danceland was a hard hit on the viability of West View Park moving into the future.

Furthermore, as local school districts were consolidating, the number of school picnic groups going to West View Park was diminishing. Many of the districts which combined had one old district going to West View, while the others had been going to Kennywood. Combined, most elected to have their picnics at Kennywood. This undoubtedly increased as Kennywood was making significant improvements to its park, while West View Park was stagnating.

West View Park closed for the 1977 season on Labor Day, September 5.  Nobody knew at the time that it would be the park's final day of operation.

Post-amusement park era 
Several weeks later, T.M. Harton Company announced that West View Park would permanently close. A shopping center and residential facility opened in 1981, with the shopping center being named after West View Park, and using a carousel horse for a logo. The shopping center continues to stand today, hosting a Giant Eagle and formerly a Kmart until its closure in 2019. FRA Associates struggled to make money on the property and ended up losing control of it.

Stick Man, a coming-of-age novel written by West View native Richard Rossi, featured the park. A recently restored George A. Romero film The Amusement Park was shot at West View Park in 1973 using mostly volunteers to represent the allegory of aging. The film was thought to be lost until two prints surfaced shortly before Romero's death.

Former attractions
West View Park had many rides and attractions over the years. Below is a list of the nine roller coasters which operated in the park.

List of roller coasters

References

External links

Amusement parks in Pennsylvania
Defunct amusement parks in Pennsylvania
1906 establishments in Pennsylvania